Isabella of Brittany (1411 – c. 1444) was a daughter of John V, Duke of Brittany, and his wife, Joan of Valois. Isabella was a member of the House of Dreux.

Family 
Isabella's maternal grandparents were Charles VI of France and Isabeau of Bavaria. Her paternal grandparents were John IV, Duke of Brittany and Joan of Navarre.

Isabella was related to three Queens of England. Two of her maternal aunts, Isabella of Valois and Catherine of Valois were queens of England and after the death of her paternal grandfather, John IV, her grandmother, Joan, became queen of England by her marriage to Henry IV of England. Isabella of Valois was married to Henry's predecessor, Richard II of England. Catherine of Valois was married to Henry IV's son, Henry V of England.

Marriage 
On 1 October 1430, at Redon, Isabella married Guy XIV de Laval. Guy fought in many different battles in the Hundred Years' War and fought alongside Joan of Arc. Guy had been betrothed to Isabella's younger sister, Margaret, who died before the marriage could take place, so Guy married Isabella instead.

Isabella and Guy had three sons and seven daughters:

Yolande of Laval (born Nantes 1 October 1431), married firstly 1443 to Alain de Rohan, Count of Porhoet and secondly  Guillaume d'Harcourt, Count of Tancarville.
Françoise of Laval (born and died 1432).
Jeanne de Laval (10 November 1433, Auray – 19 December 1498, Beaufort-en-Vallée), married to René of Anjou.
Anne of Laval (born and died 1434).  
François of Laval (16 November 1435, Moncontour – 28 January 1501, Laval), successor of his father as Guy XV, married to Catherine of Alençon
Jean of Laval (14 February 1437, Redon – 14 August 1476), twin with Arthuse; Lord of la Roche-Bernard.
Arthuse of Laval (14 February 1437, Redon – 1461, Marseille), twin with Jean; she died unmarried.
Hélène of Laval (17 June 1439, Ploërmel – 3 December 1500), married Jean de Malestroit, Baron of Derval.
Louise of Laval (born 13 January 1441), married 15 May 1468 Jean III de Brosse, Count of Penthièvre. 
Pierre of Laval (17 July 1442, Montfort-sur-Meu – 1493), archbishop of Rheims.

Isabella died around 1444, and she is buried in Nantes. Her husband remarried after her death, to Françoise de Dinan, widow of Isabella's younger brother Gilles, Lord of Chantocé. Her husband was buried at the collegial church of Saint-Thugal at Laval.

House of Brittany
This family tree shows Isabella's paternal side of her family, her mother and brothers. It shows that after the death of her brothers, her uncle, Arthur became Duke of Brittany.

Ancestry

References

Sources

1411 births
1444 deaths
House of Dreux
15th-century Breton women
People of the Hundred Years' War